The lesser palatine nerves (posterior palatine nerve) are branches of the maxillary nerve (CN V2). They descends through the greater palatine canal alongside the greater palatine nerve, and emerge (separately) through the lesser palatine foramen to pass posteriorward. They supply the soft palate, tonsil, and uvula.

See also
Greater palatine nerve

References

External links
 
 
 

Trigeminal nerve